La Chapelle-en-Juger is a former commune in the Manche department in Normandy in north-western France. On 1 January 2016, it was merged into the new commune of Thèreval.

The local name of the commune is La Chapelle-Enjuger, as indicated in local sollicitor's documents.

World War II
After the liberation of the area by Allied Forces in early June 1944, engineers of the Ninth Air Force IX Engineering Command began construction of a combat Advanced Landing Ground to the south of the town.  Declared operational on 5 July, the airfield was designated as "A-5", it was used by the 404th Fighter Group which flew P-47 Thunderbolts until the end of August when the unit moved into Central France. Afterward, the airfield was closed.

See also
Communes of the Manche department

References

Chapelleenjuger